The ANBO III was a parasol-wing monoplane training and utility aircraft designed for the Lithuanian Army in 1929. It became the first aircraft of Lithuanian design to be built in series, with two batches of four aircraft produced in 1930 and 1931. The ANBO IIIs also saw service as reconnaissance machines.

Development & Production
Production aircraft began rolling off the line in the autumn of 1930, starting with Number 39 (39 is a designation, it was not the 39th production aircraft) in August, which passed tests on September 9, being flown by Gustaitis himself. Three more were completed by October, 1931. The second series, starting in the spring of 1931 incorporated the following changes: fuselage lengthened by 1/2 meter, larger fuel tanks installed, and turning rudders installed on all except Number 33 & Number 40. 

In early 1931 the ANBO III was flying with a  Walter Mars I, a nine-cylinder radial engine. The Czech-built engines started showing signs of failure after fewer than 200 hours, so British engines were procured. One Armstrong Siddeley Mongoose was ordered and tested on Number 48. This was the same weight as the Mars I and proved reliable so 4 more were ordered between 1934 and 1935. Six Armstrong Siddeley Genet Major were ordered for the ANBO V.

Operators

Lithuanian Air Force

Specifications (Walter Mars I engine)

References

Further reading

 

Parasol-wing aircraft
Single-engined tractor aircraft
1920s Lithuanian military trainer aircraft
3
Aircraft first flown in 1929